An electromagnetic pump is a pump that moves liquid metal, molten salt, brine, or other electrically conductive liquid using electromagnetism.

A magnetic field is set at right angles to the direction the liquid moves in, and a current is passed through it. This causes an electromagnetic force that moves the liquid.

Applications include pumping molten solder in many wave soldering machines, pumping liquid-metal coolant, and magnetohydrodynamic drive.

Working principle

A magnetic field (brc) always exists around the current (I)-carrying conductor. When this current-carrying conductor is subjected to an external magnetic field (Bap), the conductor experiences a force perpendicular to the direction of I and Bap. This is because the magnetic field produced by the conductor and the applied magnetic field attempt to align with each other. A similar effect can seen between two ordinary magnets.

This principle is used in an electromagnetic pump. The current is fed through a conducting liquid. Two permanent magnets are arranged to produce a magnetic field Bap as shown in the figure. The supplied current has a current density (J) and the magnetic field associated with this current can be called "Reaction magnetic Field (brc)". The two magnetic fields Bap and brc attempt to align with each other. This causes mechanical motion of the fluid.

Einstein–Szilard electromagnetic pump
Designed for the Einstein–Szilard electromagnetic refrigerator (not the pumpless Einstein refrigerator), it uses electromagnetic induction to move conductive liquid metal without electrodes, to compress a working gas, pentane. It is a liquid linear induction motor.

See also
Magnetic flow meter
Magnetohydrodynamic drive

References

Bibliography
Baker, Richard S., Tessier, Manuel J. Handbook of Electromagnetic pump technology. 1987. osti 5041159. oclc 246618050.

External links
 The Electromagnetic Pump, Lecture Demonstration Manual, University of Melbourne (archived)
 Analysis and Design of Electromagnetic Pump, 2010
 Electromagnetic pumps, Carli Precimeter GmbH (archived)

Pumps